The Edsel Auctioneer were a band formed in Leeds in 1988 by Ashley Horner (guitar/ vocals), Phil Pettler (bass/ vocals), Aidan Winterburn (vocals, guitar) and Chris Cooper (drums). They were named after the ill-fated Ford automobile whose front grille was supposed to have resembled a woman's pudenda. Best friends with Pale Saints, they lived on the same street in Leeds, Harold Avenue (which spawned the so-called Voice of the Harolds).

Career
In early 1988 they recorded a number of songs for a small independent record label in Glasgow but this never got released. Instead the songs found their way to BBC Radio 1 DJ, John Peel, who described in Offbeat magazine the moment he heard the cassette he drove off the A12 to Suffolk in shock. Peel subsequently invited the band into Maida Vale to do a session. They recorded four songs ("Brickwall Dawn", "Blind Hurricane", "Between Two Crimes" and "Place In the Sun") and it was broadcast in late 1988, and again in 1989. On the back of this they signed to Decoy Records, a sub-division of Rhythm King Records that also was the home of Mega City Four. They recorded their first single "Our New Skin" / "Strung" in Camden with Iain Burgess and followed this with an EP "Stickleback" / "Bed, Table, Chair" / "Necessary Disease" / "Unbroken Line". These first two releases were collected as a mini-album, Voice of the Harolds. The music has often been classified as something like Dinosaur Jr., Hüsker Dü and My Bloody Valentine, although there were also traces of The Byrds, the Monkees and sixties garage bands as well as the Go-Betweens and Pixies.

At this time, they were moderately successful in the UK, supporting Teenage Fanclub, Ned's Atomic Dustbin, Senseless Things, The Telescopes, Buffalo Tom, Silverfish, The Lemonheads and The Wedding Present. They were televised on Transmission, an early morning ITV show and Snub TV on BBC Two (https://www.youtube.com/watch?v=UEuu0A_LdbE) where Aidan Winterburn the lead singer can be seen attempting to stop security beating up his brother in the crowd. 

Chris Cooper left in 1992 to join Pale Saints full-time (he had been in both groups at the same time) and Tris Williams joined the band as replacement.

Edsel Auctioneer recorded their first proper album Simmer with Chris Nagle (who had produced The Charlatans) in Edinburgh and Strawberry Studios in Stockport in late 1990. The record label had financial problems, and the album was not released for nearly a year, by which time a lot of momentum had dissipated. The album spawned a series of singles including "Starfish" (which included a cover of Madonna's "Borderline") and "Undertow" in 1992 and 1993. The label subsequently folded and the group were forced to look for another label. Alias Records (home to Archers of Loaf and Yo La Tengo) came to the rescue in 1993 after they played the CMJ festival in New York and toured the US. Their second album The Good Time Music of... was recorded in Huddersfield in 1994 by Steve Whitfield (engineer of The Cure) and released by Alias in 1995. The album spawned one single "Summer Hit", an atypically breezy bubblegum pop song with Meriel Barham from Pale Saints singing back-up. The album also had a guest spot from Paul Yeadon from Bivouac. The album was not commercially successful, and the band broke up in late 1995 with various kinds of job and family obligations taking over.

Phil Pettler and Chris Cooper (Bluebell carriage cleaner) now play in the Leeds based pop-punk band, Cyanide PIlls, Aidan Winterburn is a lecturer at Leeds Metropolitan University and writes for Grafik magazine in the UK; whilst Ashley Horner is a film-maker in Newcastle running Pinball Films. He completed his first feature length film, The Other Possibility in 2007, (aka Kaz), which featured music from Edsel Auctioneer. His last film 'brilliantlove', written by Sean Conway, screened at the Tribeca Film Festival and was released by IFC and Soda Pictures in the US and UK. It was nominated for a BIFA in 2010.

External links
Myspace page
Birdpoo

English rock music groups
Musical groups from Leeds
Musical groups established in 1988
Musical groups disestablished in 1995